Mount Bouvier is a massive, mainly ice-covered mountain,  high, immediately north of the head of Stonehouse Bay in the east part of Adelaide Island. It was discovered and roughly positioned by the French Antarctic Expedition, 1903–05, and named by Jean-Baptiste Charcot for Louis Bouvier, a prominent French naturalist. It was re-surveyed by the French Antarctic Expedition, 1908–10, and by the Falkland Islands Dependencies Survey in 1948–50.

References
 

Mountains of Adelaide Island